The Sosso Empire was a twelfth-century Kaniaga kingdom of West Africa.   

The Kingdom of Sosso, also written as Soso or Susu, was an ancient kingdom on the coast of west Africa. During its empire, reigned their most famous leader, Sumaoro Kante.   

Sumaoro Kante was said to be a cruel, harsh leader of his kingdom according to old African historians. His harsh leadership style kept the empire in balance and led to organization within the nation states. There was also strong economic  success under his rule. He is said to have used "magic" in order to scare his people and keep his kingdom together.  

The Sosso Empire succeeded the Ghana Empire after the downfall of the latter. Sumanguru captured the state called Kangaba during his reign, which later became the state of Mali. Sumanguru controlled his people under a harsh rule until he was eventually overthrown by African folklore hero, Sundiata. Sundiata was exiled from his home in the empire as a child. However, he traveled the surrounding area, gathered allies and troops to fight with him, and fought Sumanguru's empire at the battle of Krina in 1235. There, Sundiata was victorious and took over the Sosso empire, effectively ending the reign of the empire.

Medieval Sosso
The modern Sosso people trace their history to a 12th- and 13th- century Kaniaga kingdom known as the "Sosso."  With the fall of the Ghana Empire, the Sosso expanded into a number of its former holdings, including its capital of Koumbi Saleh.  Under King Soumaoro Kanté, the Sosso briefly conquered the Mandinka kingdoms of what is now Mali.  These gains were lost at the Battle of Kirina (c. 1235) when Mandinka prince Sundiata Keita led a coalition of smaller states to soundly defeat the Sosso, thus beginning the Mali Empire.  Sundiata marched on to the city of Sosso itself and destroyed it, marking the kingdom's end.

References

External links
 Empire Sosso of Soumaoro Kante 

History of Guinea
Political history of Mali
History of Senegal

es:Sosso
id:Sosso
it:Sosso
pl:Sosso
Former empires in Africa